Dorota Miler (born 1 February 1944) is a Polish gymnast. She competed in six events at the 1964 Summer Olympics.

References

External links
 

1944 births
Living people
Polish female artistic gymnasts
Olympic gymnasts of Poland
Gymnasts at the 1964 Summer Olympics
Sportspeople from Ruda Śląska
20th-century Polish women